Namibia will compete at the 2014 Summer Youth Olympics, in Nanjing, China from 16 August to 28 August 2014.

Archery

Namibia was given a quota to compete by the tripartite committee.

Individual

Team

Athletics

Namibia qualified one athlete.

Qualification Legend: Q=Final A (medal); qB=Final B (non-medal); qC=Final C (non-medal); qD=Final D (non-medal); qE=Final E (non-medal)

Boys
Field Events

Beach Volleyball

Namibia qualified a girls' team by their performance at the CAVB Qualification Tournament.

Cycling

Namibia qualified a boys' team based on its ranking issued by the UCI.

Team

Mixed Relay

Football

Namibia has been selected to represent Africa.

Girls' Tournament

Roster

 Asteria Angula
 Jasmine Baas
 Chaan Beukes
 Chelsea de Gouveia
 Luzane de Wee
 Revival Gawanas
 Christophine Hanse
 Ignacia Haoses
 Queandra Kasume Batista
 Ivone Kooper
 Mbitjitandjambi Mungunda
 Nondiyo Noreses
 Tarakuje Rukero
 Anna Shaende
 Ashley Solomons
 Vetjiwa Tjivau
 Beverly Uueziua
 Bianca van Wyk

Group stage

Fifth place match

Gymnastics

Trampoline

Namibia qualified one athlete based on its performance at the 2014 African Trampoline Championships. Later Namibia was given a quota to compete by the tripartite committee.

Swimming

Namibia qualified three swimmers.

Boys

Girls

Tennis

Namibia was given a quota to compete by the tripartite committee.

Singles

Doubles

References

Olympics
Nations at the 2014 Summer Youth Olympics
Namibia at the Youth Olympics